Kristina Graovac (née Georgijev; born August 14, 1991) is a Serbian female handballer playing for Turkish handball team Ardeşen GSK and the Serbian national team. The -tall sportswoman plays in the goalkeeper position.

Between 2013 and 2015, she played in her country for ZORK Jagodina before she joined Ardeşen GSK in the 2015–16 season. 

She played at the 2015–16 Women's EHF Cup Winners' Cup for Ardeşen GSK.

Her sister is Tamara Radojević handball player.

References

1991 births
People from Pirot
Serbian female handball players
Serbian expatriate sportspeople in Turkey
Expatriate handball players in Turkey
Ardeşen GSK players
Living people